"Bésame En La Boca" is a Latin pop song with influences bolero written and produced by Adrian Posse and Didi Gutman. It was released by Mexican singer Paulina Rubio as the final single from her third studio album, El Tiempo Es Oro (1995). It was released in June 1995 in Mexico and in September in the rest of Latin America. Rubio's cover was also included on the soundtrack of the film of the same name, which she also starred in. The song did not have commercial success like their other singles and the airplay promotion was overshadowed with the promotional song of the Mexican telenovela Pobre Niña Rica.

Track listing and formats
 Mexico CD, Single, Promo

 "Bésame En La Boca" – 3:56

References

1995 singles
Paulina Rubio songs
Spanish-language songs
EMI Latin singles